South Texas College of Law Houston (STCL or South Texas) is a private law school in Houston, Texas. Founded in 1923, it is accredited by the American Bar Association. South Texas College of Law Houston is the oldest law school in the city of Houston. In 1923, the YMCA made the decision to establish a law school with a focus on offering night classes for working professionals.

In 1998, the College was admitted as a member school into the Association of American Law Schools (AALS) by a unanimous vote of the AALS House of Representatives; the AALS is considered the learned society for legal education. The College also joined with four other independent law schools – California Western School of Law, New England School of Law, Stetson University College of Law, and William Mitchell College of Law – to create a unique academic partnership, the Consortium for Innovative Legal Education. The consortium represents a cooperative effort designed to enhance and strengthen the educational mission of each school separately and all of them collectively, providing expanded opportunities for educational programs on a national and international basis.

Rankings 
U.S. News & World Report's Rankings of Best Law Schools ranked South Texas College of Law's Part-time program as 49th in the country (tied with the University of Akron) for 2023. The school overall ranked 147-192.

Programs 
South Texas College of Law Houston was named the #1 law school of the decade in moot court competitions, holding the most national championships of any public or private law school in the U.S., by PreLaw Magazine.

Trial advocacy program 
The South Texas College of Law trial advocacy program consistently ranks in the top 10 of the nation. South Texas College of Law Houston's moot court program was ranked 1st in the nation according to data compiled by the University of Houston Law Center’s Blakely Advocacy Institute in 2018 and has consistently ranked in the top 4 ever since. The trial advocacy program at South Texas College of Law Houston was ranked 3rd in the country (tied with Stetson University and American University) for 2023 by U.S. News & World Report. The South Texas College of Law Houston Alternate Dispute Resolution Program (ADR), where students compete in competitive mediations, negotiations, and as mediators, is also highly ranked. In 2020, U.S. News & World Report ranked the South Texas College of Law Houston's dispute resolution program 31st in the nation. Additionally, PreLaw Magazine named South Texas College of Law Houston as "Top Law School for ADR".

South Texas College of Law Houston has won 133 national championships in advocacy.

Bar passage and employment 
Of the South Texas College of Law Houston graduates who took the Texas bar exam for the first time in July 2021, 80.89% passed, vs the overall passage rate of 80.47% for all other law schools of the State of Texas.

According to South Texas College of Law Houston's official 2021 ABA-required disclosures, 66% of the class of 2021 obtained full-time, long-term, JD-required employment nine months after graduation.

Academics 
South Texas College of Law Houston is also part of a consortium of four independent ABA- and AALS-accredited American law schools—California Western School of Law, New England School of Law, and William Mitchell College of Law. The Consortium for Innovative Legal Education, combines resources designed to enhance and strengthen the educational mission of each school separately and all of them collectively. This partnership provides access to educational programs on a national and international basis.

Students at South Texas can study abroad in London, Ireland, Malta, the Czech Republic, France, the Netherlands, Denmark, Turkey, Chile, and Mexico. In 2017, U.S. Supreme Court Justice Ruth Bader Ginsburg taught a course for South Texas College of Law Houston in Malta. In previous years, Justice Antonin G. Scalia and Chief Justice John Roberts both taught in international study abroad programs.

Publications 
South Texas College of Law Houston publishes several student-edited journals of legal scholarship, including Corporate Counsel Review, Currents: Journal of International Economic Law, South Texas Law Review, Texas Journal of Business Law, and Hispanic Journal of Law and Policy

 South Texas Law Review is a student-edited quarterly legal journal published at the South Texas College of Law Houston. It was established in 1954. The review publishes scholarly works as well as comments and case notes. South Texas Law Review has published articles written by five Justices from the Supreme Court of the United States: Arthur Goldberg, William J. Brennan, Jr., William Rehnquist, John Paul Stevens, and Clarence Thomas.  South Texas Law Review has published over 40 symposium issues on a wide range of topics. Since 1994, the review and the law school have hosted an annual ethics symposium during the fall semester. The symposia include a conference where scholars present papers on the year's topic. The papers are published by the review in a subsequent volume.
 Currents is the official journal of  international economic law at South Texas College of Law Houston. Debuting in the winter of 1991 and featuring an article by Senator Lloyd Bentsen, Currents is published twice annually by the law student members and editors, who receive academic credit for writing projects and staff participation.  Currents focuses on international trade law in its broadest sense, addressing the legal effects and structure of international trade agreements as well as the legal aspects of international business transactions, including the sale of goods and services, licensing, investment, and dispute resolutions. Individual past editions have focused on the North American Free Trade Agreement (NAFTA) marketplace, the European Union, maritime law, emerging markets and international finance, and oil and gas transactions in Latin America.

Costs 
Total cost of tuition is $35,550 for 2020, for both in-state and out-of-state students. South Texas College of Law continues to be the 6th least expensive law school in Texas out of a total of 10. The total cost of attendance (indicating the cost of tuition, fees, and living expenses) at South Texas for the 2017–2018 academic year was $56,000.

Community resources 
South Texas sponsors the "Direct Representation Clinics", which provide legal representation to low-income residents of Harris County, Texas, in the areas of family law, probate, estate planning, and guardianship cases. South Texas is also the first Texas law school to provide $400 each month toward student-loan indebtedness for its alumni working for nonprofit legal-aid organizations that provide services to the poor.

Attempt to merge with Texas A&M University 

In 1998, South Texas College of Law Houston (at that time, called South Texas College of Law) tried to merge with Texas A&M University under a private/public partnership. Under the proposal, the law school would have remained a private school, but would have been branded as the Texas A&M Law Center and would have awarded law degrees under the A&M seal. The deal went sour after a lengthy legal fight with the Texas Higher Education Coordinating Board, the governing body of the state's public institutions. The courts ruled that the schools had failed to obtain the board's approval before entering into the agreement. The University of Houston and other institutions voiced concern about the partnership. In 2013, Texas A&M University entered into a similar arrangement with the Texas Wesleyan School of Law in Fort Worth, Texas, thereby creating the Texas A&M University School of Law.

Litigation over name change 

Until mid-2016, the law school was called "South Texas College of Law". On June 22, 2016, the day on which South Texas College of Law announced a name change to "Houston College of Law", the University of Houston (which has its College of Law within the University of Houston Law Center) announced that the University was "concerned about the significant confusion this creates in the marketplace and will take any and all appropriate legal actions to protect the interests of our institution, our brand, and our standing in the communities we serve." The University of Houston System filed a lawsuit on June 27, 2016, in the United States District Court in Houston. On October 14, 2016, the U.S. District Court issued a preliminary injunction requiring that South Texas College of law stop using the name "Houston College of Law," pending further developments in the case.

On November 7, 2016, the dean of the law school announced that the name would be changed to "South Texas College of Law Houston".

Notable alumni 
 Chris Bell, former Congressman
 Briscoe Cain, member of the Texas House of Representatives
 Robert R. Casey, former Congressman
 John Culberson, former Congressman
 John P. Devine, Texas Supreme Court Justice
 Joseph Gutheinz, attorney who has investigated stolen and missing moon rocks
 Eva Guzman, Texas Supreme Court Justice
Brad Hart, mayor of Cedar Rapids, Iowa
 Charles Holcomb, judge of the Texas Court of Criminal Appeals, 2001 to 2010
 Paul John Hilbert, member of the Texas House of Representatives
 Joan Huffman, member of the Texas State Senate; former state district court judge
 Patrica R. "Pat" Lykos, former Harris County District Attorney
 David M. Medina, former Texas Supreme Court Justice
 Sam Nuchia, former Chief of the Houston Police Department
 Reed O'Connor, United States district judge for the Northern District of Texas
 Madalyn Murray O'Hair, Founder of American Atheists, did not pass the bar exam and never practiced law
 Dan Rather, former CBS News anchor (did not graduate)
 Leighton Schubert, member of the Texas House of Representatives
 Jim Sharp, state court judge in Houston, 2009–2014
 Robert Talton, member of the Texas House of Representatives
Austin Walton, certified NBA agent and owner of Walton Sports Management Group

References

External links 

 
South Texas Law Review
Currents: Journal of International Economic Law

Law schools in Texas
Universities and colleges in Houston
Educational institutions established in 1923
Universities and colleges founded by the YMCA

Downtown Houston
1923 establishments in Texas